The Tikal–Calakmul wars were a series of wars, mainly between Tikal and Calakmul on the Yucatán Peninsula, but also with vassal states in the Petén Basin such as Copan, Dos Pilas, Naranjo, Sacul, Quiriguá, and briefly Yaxchilan had a role in initiating the first war.

Background 
In 537 the Ajaws of Bonampak, Lakamtuun, and Calakmul were captured by Yaxchilan. Bonampak and Lakamtuun remained under the control of Yaxchilan but in retaliation Calakmul conquered the latter. This gave the polity a adventagous strategic position with territory in both the east and the west of Tikal. In numerical terms, however, Calakmul remained inferior to Tikal: Despite being one of the most prosperous Maya cities, Calakmul housed just about 50,000 people, while its entire kingdom had a population of 200,000. In contrast, Tikal was home to almost half a million people. Both city states greatly eclipsed other Mayan polities, and have been described as "superpowers" that led rival power blocs.

First war, 537–572

After conquering Yaxchilan and its subsidiaries, Calakmul allied itself with anti-Tikal cities such as Caracol, El Perú and El Zotz. The latter in particular was located closely to Tikal, and had been opposed to its more powerful neighbor for a long time. The conflict between Tikal, Calakmul and their respective allies resulted in the increasing sophistication of Maya warfare, including the construction of large, well-fortified citadels to protect strategically significant routes. One of the most notable forts, La Cuernavilla, was constructed between Tikal and El Zotz.

Calakmul went on to conquer Naranjo in 546 (9.5.11.11.18 on the Maya calendar). Tikal and its kingdom were not destroyed, but suffered major losses and went into decline after the war ended in 572 (9.6.18.0.14).

"Cold War"
The phrase cold war has been used to describe the time between major conflicts involving Calakmul and Tikal. During these times there was continuous war but no major battles or political changes took place. There were of course minor border skirmishes.

As Tikal gradually regained strength, its local, smaller rivals such as El Zotz declined. In 629, Tikal's king K'ihnich Muwahn Jol II sent his son B'alaj Chan K'awiil to Dos Pilas where he established a military outpost to defend Tikal's wider zone of control. At first, B'alaj Chan K'awiil maintained loyalty to Tikal, and as time went on fighting erupted once more between Tikal and Calakmul. The latter gradually gained the upper hand, and Dos Pilas was eventually overrun by Calakmul after years of heavy combat. B'alaj Chan K'awiil initially fled into exile, but then opted to switch sides in 648.

Second war, 648–695

The second war lasted from 648 to 695. One of the main battle grounds of this conflict was Dos Pilas, now a separatist kingdom led by B'alaj Chan K'awiil, under Calakmul's dominance. Supported by his new allies,  B'alaj Chan K'awiil consequently began a destructive "proxy war" against his old mother city. In 672, Tikal retook Dos Pilas, but B'alaj Chan K'awiil escaped to Aguateca. He rallied his followers and allies, and launched a counter-offensive, defeating the army of Tikal in a major battle in 679.

After his victory, B'alaj Chan K'awiil captured and sacrificed Tikal's ruler (his own brother). From then until 695, three years after B'alaj's death, Calakmul factually dominated Tikal. In 695, under the leadership of Jasaw Chan K'awiil I, Tikal won a major battle with Calakmul and turned the tables, effectively ending the Second Tikal–Calakmul War.

Second interval
With Tikal having liberated itself, it once more attacked Dos Pilas and challenged Calakmul's power. In 702, Tikal suffered another defeat by Dos Pilas.

Third war, 720–744

K'ak' Tiliw Chan Yopaat, Ajaw of Quiriguá was one of the key people during the third war. Quiriguá was a province of Copán, then in 734 K'ak' Tiliw Chan Yopaat led a revolution against Uaxaclajuun Ub'aah K'awiil, Ajaw of Copán. Wamaw K'awiil, kaloomte (high king, a position higher than ajaw) of Calakmul traveled to Quiriguá and formed an alliance with K'ak' Tiliw Chan Yopaat. Uaxaclajuun Ub'aah K'awiil was executed in 738, and Quiriguá became independent. By 744 El Peru and Naranjo had been reconquered by Tikal, and Calakmul had been defeated.

Aftermath
As Tikal and Calakmul fought each other, Dos Pilas experienced a period of expansion, conquering several other small cities states. However, Dos Pilas' kingdom collapsed around 761, though its dynasty survived until the early 800s in Aguateca.

Having been deprived of its military reputation Calakmul lost its northern provinces and collapsed, the last recorded date in the city was 899, possibly 909. Similarly Tikal, and most of the Maya cities were destroyed in the Maya collapse. The war may have contributed to the collapse, along with overpopulation, disease, famine, and others.

References

Works cited 
 
 

 
Tikal
History of the Yucatán Peninsula
Mesoamerican warfare
6th century in the Maya civilization
7th century in the Maya civilization
8th century in the Maya civilization
6th-century conflicts
7th-century conflicts
8th-century conflicts
Calakmul
Pre-Columbian warfare